Southern Lakes was an electoral district in rural Yukon which returned a member (known as an MLA) to the Legislative Assembly of the Yukon in Canada. It was one of the eight rural ridings in the Yukon at the time.

Southern Lakes was originally created as part of the 2002 Electoral Boundaries Commission when the riding of Ross River-Southern Lakes was divided into the ridings of Southern Lakes and Pelly-Nisutlin. Southern Lakes retained the communities of Carcross and Tagish and merged with the bedroom community of Marsh Lake.

The riding was also part of the traditional territory of the Carcross/Tagish First Nation, the Teslin Tlingit Council, the Kwanlin Dün First Nation, and the Ta'an Kwach'an Council. It was bordered by the rural ridings of Pelly-Nisutlin, Kluane, and Lake Laberge, as well as the rural-residential riding of Mount Lorne south of Whitehorse.

The riding was held by the Yukon Party's Patrick Rouble during its brief existence.

In the 2009 electoral redistribution, the riding was dissolved, combining with the Hamlet of Mount Lorne to form the new riding of Mount Lorne-Southern Lakes.

MLAs

Election results

2006 general election

|-

| NDP
| Kevin Barr
| align="right"| 238
| align="right"| 36.6%
| align="right"| +3.2%

| Liberal
| Ethel Tizya
| align="right"| 134
| align="right"| 20.6%
| align="right"| +2.0%
|-
! align=left colspan=3|Total
! align=right| 651
! align=right| 100.0%
! align=right| –
|}

2002 general election

|-

| NDP
| Rachael Lewis
| align="right"| 190
| align="right"| 33.4%
| align="right"| –

| Liberal
| Manfred Janssen
| align="right"| 106
| align="right"| 18.6%
| align="right"| –

| Independent
| Warren Braunberger
| align="right"| 41
| align="right"| 7.2%
| align="right"| –
|-
! align=left colspan=3|Total
! align=right| 569
! align=right| 100.0%
! align=right| –
|}

References

Former Yukon territorial electoral districts